Max Fabian may refer to:

 Max Fabian (cinematographer), Polish-Jewish cinematographer
 Max Fabian (painter), German-Jewish painter

See also 
 Max Fabiani, Slovenian-Italian architect and town planner